Calvo is a hamlet in Cumbria, England.

See also

Listed buildings in Holme Low

References

Hamlets in Cumbria
Allerdale